Tuxentius kaffana is a butterfly in the family Lycaenidae. It is found in south-western Ethiopia.

References

Endemic fauna of Ethiopia
Polyommatini
Butterflies of Africa
Taxa named by George Talbot (entomologist)
Butterflies described in 1935